Idaho Legislative District 32 is one of 35 districts of the Idaho Legislature. It is currently represented by Mark Harris, Republican of Soda Springs, Marc Gibbs, Republican of Grace, and Chad Christensen, Republican of Idaho Falls.
Chad Christensen defeated incumbent Thomas Loertscher in the May 2018 Republican primary by a narrow margin. Thomas Loertscher attempted but failed at reelection by running a write-in campaign for the November 2018 General election.

District profile (2012–present) 
District 32 currently consists of all of Bear Lake, Caribou, Franklin, Oneida, and Teton Counties and a portion of Bonneville County.

District profile (2002–2012) 
From 2002 to 2012, District 32 consisted of a portion of Bonneville County.

District profile (1992–2002) 
From 1992 to 2002, District 32 consisted of all of Bear Lake, Caribou, Franklin, and Oneida Counties and a portion of Bannock County.

See also

 List of Idaho Senators
 List of Idaho State Representatives

References

External links
Idaho Legislative District Map (with members)
Idaho Legislature (official site)

32
Bear Lake County, Idaho
Caribou County, Idaho
Franklin County, Idaho
Oneida County, Idaho
Teton County, Idaho
Bonneville County, Idaho